J.J. Juez is a Mexican telenovela produced by Irene Sabido for Televisa in 1979. J.J. Juez is a remake of the original Chilean novela (1977).

Cast 
Blanca Sánchez as Julia Jimenez
Sonia Furió as Natalia
Salvador Pineda as Martin
Silvia Pasquel as Paula Garmendia
Joaquín Cordero as Don Nicolas Garmendia
Lorenzo de Rodas as Gonzalo
Nadia Haro Oliva as Paulette
Guillermo Orea as Maestro Bondad
Miguel Córcega as Hilario
Lilia Aragón as Gilda
Héctor Cruz  as Bruno
Luis Torner as Anselmo
Luis Bayardo as Pajarito
José Elías Moreno as Rodrigo
Renata Flores as Irene
Héctor Gómez  as Marcial
Virginia Jimeno as Marga
Tita Grieg as Malvina
Enrique Gilabert as Juez
Arturo Lorca as Hamlet
Alma Delfina

References

External links 

Mexican telenovelas
1979 telenovelas
Televisa telenovelas
Spanish-language telenovelas
1979 Mexican television series debuts
1979 Mexican television series endings
Mexican television series based on Chilean television series